"Try Not to Look So Pretty" is a song co-written and recorded by American country music artist Dwight Yoakam.  It was released in February 1994 as the fourth single from his album This Time. The song peaked at number 14 in the United States and at number 4 in Canada.  It was written by Yoakam and Kostas.

Music video
The music video was directed Gregory R. Alosio with help from Dwight Yoakam.

Chart performance
"Try Not to Look So Pretty" debuted at number 74 on the U.S. Billboard Hot Country Singles & Tracks for the week of February 19, 1994.

Year-end charts

References

Dwight Yoakam songs
1994 singles
Songs written by Dwight Yoakam
Songs written by Kostas (songwriter)
Reprise Records singles
1993 songs
Song recordings produced by Pete Anderson